Terhune House may refer to:
 Terhune House (Paramus, New Jersey)
 Terhune House (Wyckoff, New Jersey)